Eric A. Stevenson (born September 1966) is a former Democratic member of the New York State Assembly who represented the 79th Assembly District serving the Morrisania and East Tremont sections of The Bronx.

Biography
Raised in Morrisania, Stevenson followed in the footsteps of his father (former District Leader Edward Stevenson, Jr.) and his grandfather (Assemblyman Edward A. Stevenson, Sr.) by serving Bronx Community Board 3 under the administrations of Bronx borough presidents Fernando Ferrer and Adolfo Carrion, Jr. After several failed attempts to win the 79th Assembly seat against both Gloria Davis and Michael Benjamin, Stevenson was successful in 2010 when Benjamin decided to step down from after flirting with challenging Jose Enrique Serrano for the US Congress.

On April 4, 2013, federal prosecutors announced that Assemblyman Stevenson had been charged with bribery, conspiracy, and other related charges. Federal Prosecutors said Stevenson took bribes in exchange for drafting, proposing, and agreeing to enact legislation to aid his co-defendants' businesses. Authorities said that a second, unidentified assemblyman who had cooperated in the corruption probe had been charged in a sealed indictment and would resign to avoid prosecution. That member was later identified by the media as Assemblyman Nelson Castro.

On January 13, 2014, Stevenson was convicted of bribery and extortion, and was thus required to vacate his Assembly seat. On May 21, 2014, he was sentenced to three years in prison.

In June 2019, Stevenson—despite his prior felony conviction—launched an exploratory committee into running for New York's 15th congressional district.

References 

1956 births
Living people
African-American state legislators in New York (state)
Democratic Party members of the New York State Assembly
American politicians convicted of bribery
New York (state) politicians convicted of corruption
New York (state) politicians convicted of crimes
Politicians from the Bronx
21st-century African-American people
20th-century African-American people